USS Demand (AMc-74) was an Accentor-class coastal minesweeper acquired by the U.S. Navy for the dangerous task of removing mines from minefields laid in the water to prevent ships from passing.

Demand was launched by the Gibbs Gas Engine Co., Jacksonville, Florida, on 22 May 1941.

World War II service 

She was placed in service on 5 September 1941 for duty in the 3d Naval District and in the 6th Naval District.

Post-war deactivation 

Demand was stricken from the Navy List on 5 December 1945.

References

External links 
 

Accentor-class minesweepers
World War II mine warfare vessels of the United States
Ships built in Jacksonville, Florida
1941 ships